Tryptophan synthase (indole-salvaging) (tryptophan synthase beta2) is an enzyme with systematic name L-serine hydro-lyase (adding indole, L-tryptophan-forming). This enzyme catalyses the following chemical reaction

 L-serine + indole  L-tryptophan + H2O

This enzyme salvages the lost indole to L-tryptophan.

References

External links 
 

EC 4.2.1